Bryan Johnson (born August 22, 1977) is an American entrepreneur, venture capitalist, writer and author. He is the founder and CEO of Kernel, a company that can monitor and record brain activity, and OS Fund, a venture capital firm that invests in early-stage science and technology companies.

He was also founder, chairman and CEO of Braintree, a company which specializes in mobile and web payment systems for ecommerce companies. Braintree acquired Venmo in 2012 for $26.2 million; the combined entity was acquired by PayPal in 2013 for $800 million.

Early life

Johnson was born in Provo, Utah, and raised in Springville, Utah, the middle child of three brothers and a sister. After his parents divorced, Johnson lived with his mother and his stepfather, the owner of a trucking company. At 19, Johnson became a Mormon missionary, customary for young men in the Church of Jesus Christ of Latter-day Saints (LDS Church), spending two years in Ecuador.

Johnson graduated with a BA in International Studies from Brigham Young University in 2003 and an MBA from the University of Chicago Booth School of Business in 2007.

Career

Early ventures
Johnson launched three startups between 1999 and 2003. The first, which sold cell phones, helped pay his way through Brigham Young University. In that business, Johnson hired other college students to sell service plans along with cell phones; Johnson earned about a $300 commission on each sale.

Johnson also started two other businesses. Inquist, a VOIP company Johnson co-founded with three other partners, with combined features of Vonage and Skype. It ended operations in 2001. After that, he joined his brother and another partner on a $70 million real estate project later in 2001. The project did not achieve sales goals.

Braintree
Johnson founded Braintree in 2007. The company was 47th on Inc. magazine's 2011 list of the 500 fastest-growing companies and 415th in 2012. That year, Braintree purchased Venmo, an app that allows users to send and receive money from each other electronically, for $26.2 million.

By September 2013, the company announced it was processing $12 billion in payments annually, with $4 billion of that on mobile. Shortly afterward, on September 26, 2013, the company was acquired by PayPal, then part of eBay, for $800 million.

OS Fund
In October 2014, Johnson announced the creation of OS Fund, which he backed with $100 million of his personal capital. The venture capital fund invests in companies that use artificial intelligence and machine learning in fields including advanced materials, computationally derived therapeutics, diagnostics, genomics, nanotechnology, and synthetic biology.

The fund has invested in companies including Ginkgo Bioworks, NuMat Technologies and Arzeda.

Kernel
Johnson founded Kernel in 2016, investing $100 million of his own money to launch the company. The company later shifted its focus to building hardware that measures electrical and hemodynamic signals produced by the brain. In 2020, Kernel demonstrated a pair of helmet-like devices that can see and record brain activity. Johnson hopes to bring the brain online with Kernel. Study may include Alzheimer's disease, aging, concussions, meditation states, and strokes. The company has said the devices may be used to help paralyzed individuals communicate, or people with mental health challenges access new therapies.

By July 2020, Kernel had raised $53 million from outside investors, following Johnson's investment of $54 million in the company since its inception.

Blueprint 
Johnson announced Project Blueprint on October 13, 2021. The project aims to measure and maximally reverse the quantified biological age of over 70 of his own organs. Johnson claims that the project has so far resulted in an epigenetic age reversal of 5.1 years.

Recognition 
Recipient of the University of Chicago Booth's 2016 Distinguished Alumni Award.

Bryan was featured in the 2020 documentary, I Am Human, about brain-machine interfaces.

Published works 
Johnson has published two children's books: Code 7: Cracking the Code for an Epic Life (2017) and The Proto Project: A Sci-Fi Adventure of the Mind (2019).

Code 7 has received Wishing Shelf Book, Royal Dragonfly Book, and Mom's Choice awards. The Proto Project has received the Mom's Choice and Purple Dragonfly Awards.

Johnson has also contributed one chapter to the book Architects of Intelligence: The Truth About AI from the People Building it (2018) by the American futurist Martin Ford.

Personal life
Johnson has three children. Johnson was raised a member of the Church of Jesus Christ of Latter-day Saints, but left the Church when he was 34. He is a pilot and has climbed Mount Kilimanjaro, the highest mountain in Africa, as well as Toubkal, the highest peak of North Africa.

See also
 Sweeney, Brigid(2011). "Crain's 40 Under 40". Chicago Business
 Sweeney, Brigid(2011). "Crain's 40 Under 40". Chicago Business
 Edwards, Jim (December 14, 2012). "We're Jealous Of This Startup's Hammock-Filled Treehouse Office". Business Insider.
 Mitroff, Sarah (October 17, 2012). "Braintree Seeks Online Payment Domination". Wired.

References

External links
 "Bryan Johnson, founder and chairman, Braintree Inc.". SBNOnline.com. July 1, 2012.
 "The 2012 Inc. 5000 List".
 "Crain's Tech 25". Chicago Business.
 "Crain's Tech 50". Chicago Business.

Living people
American venture capitalists
Brigham Young University alumni
1977 births
University of Chicago alumni
Former Latter Day Saints
American transhumanists
Life extensionists